Emping are a type of Indonesian chips, a bite-size snack kripik cracker, made of melinjo or belinjo (Gnetum gnemon) nuts (which are seeds). Emping crackers have a slightly bitter taste. Emping snacks are available in markets plain (original), salty, spicy or sweet, depending on the addition of salt or caramelized sugar.

Production

Emping production is a home industry, with emping traditionally handmade in a labor-intensive process. The melinjo seeds are sauteed in a medium fire without oil, or sometimes using sand as a media. Some people boil the melinjo seeds to ease the peeling process. Both the softer outer skin and the harder inner skin of the seeds are peeled off by hand. Each of the gnetum seeds is whacked with a wooden hammer-like instrument or pressed with a stone cylinder to create flat and round emping, and later arranged in a tray made of weaved bamboo and sun-dried for a whole day. Each emping chip is commonly created from a single gnetum nut, although there are variants which combine several seeds to create larger emping with sizes similar to krupuk. These large emping, however, are often mixed with other types of starch, such as corn or tuber starch. There are two types of emping thickness available in markets, thin and thick. Thin emping are usually plain or salty, while thick emping are usually sweet, coated with caramelized sugar or spiced with chilli pepper.

The dried emping chips are collected, packed, and sold at market. Raw emping, as bought from traditional markets, are better when sun-dried first to reduce their humidity, then later fried with ample hot vegetable oil until they expand, becoming crispy and turning golden yellow. Emping are produced in many parts of Indonesia, from Limpung in Central Java, Pidie in Aceh to Sulawesi. However, the main production areas are in Java, with Karangtawang village in Kuningan Regency West Java, Bantul Regency in Yogyakarta, Klaten Regency, Batang Regency, and Magetan Regency in Central Java.

Consumption 

Raw (unfried) emping are usually available in Indonesian traditional markets, while in snack stores, supermarkets, and restaurants mostly pre-packed, ready to eat emping are available. Most emping are plain flavoured (original), served with a pinch of salt. Emping have been exported to the Netherlands, USA and the Middle East.
In the Netherlands, due to historic ties with Indonesia, packaged dried (raw) emping is also available for home frying. These are to be found in Indonesian specialty stores referred to by Indonesian names such as "Toko" or "Warung" (both meaning shop or store).

Emping are frequently served solely as a snack or accompaniment to Indonesian traditional dishes. They are often added as a crispy addition to Indonesian dishes such as soto, nasi uduk, sop buntut, gado-gado, lontong sayur, nasi goreng, nasi kuning, laksa and bubur ayam.

See also 

 Kripik
 Krupuk
 Rempeyek

References

External links 

Indonesian snack foods
Deep fried foods
Vegetarian dishes of Indonesia